Miliband of Brothers is a 2010 satirical docu-drama following the lives and careers of British politicians David Miliband and younger brother Ed, who at the time were both contesting the 2010 Labour leadership contest. Written by David Quantick, the programme was first shown on More4. It was produced by the same production team as the similar 2009 documentary When Boris Met Dave.

The documentary charted the Miliband brothers' paths into politics interspersed with interviews from Tony Benn, Neil Kinnock and Oona King amongst friends and teachers, looking into how they both ended up with jobs in the cabinets of Tony Blair and Gordon Brown. To add to the familial similarity, David Miliband was played by Henry Lloyd-Hughes and Ed by his brother Ben Lloyd-Hughes. The title, a pun on the phrase "Band of Brothers" was inspired by a comment by Caitlin Moran's "Celebrity Watch" column.

Sam Wollaston, reviewing the production in The Guardian wrote: "There are a few funny moments (I quite liked the Top Trumps – Leon Trotsky, revolutionary status: 82 points). Mostly it's just very hammy and very silly, as the Tory one was."

Cast

References

External links
 Miliband of Brothers at Channel4.com

British television documentaries
Channel 4 original programming
2010 television films
2010 films
2010 in British politics
British satirical television shows
Political satirical television series
Ed Miliband
British political comedy television series
Works about British politicians
Cultural depictions of British men
Cultural depictions of politicians
2010s English-language films
2010s British films